Keith Andrew Leonard (born 10 November 1950) is an English former professional footballer who played as a striker for Aston Villa. He also played on loan at Port Vale, and previously played non-league football for Kidderminster Harriers, Darlaston, and Highgate United. He won the League Cup with Villa in 1975, and was also promoted out of the Second Division. He later became a coach, and led the Aston Villa youth players to FA Youth Cup victory in 1980; he later served Birmingham City as caretaker manager in 1986.

Playing career
Born in Birmingham, Leonard worked as a draughtsman whilst playing non-League football with Highgate United, before he joined Aston Villa in April 1972. He made his debut against Fulham but after just a few appearances fractured his right leg in two places in a road accident on Boxing Day 1972. After recovering from his injuries he spent a few months on loan to Port Vale to regain fitness. Arriving at Vale Park in November 1973, he scored once in 13 Third Division appearances, and his performances persuaded the club to offer Villa £5,000 for his services on a permanent basis. The bid failed and he returned to Villa Park in February 1974. "Valiants" manager Roy Sproson doubled the offer in September 1974, but was again rebuffed.

On his return he played alongside Brian Little in their 1974–75 Second Division promotion campaign and in the 1975 League Cup final 1–0 victory over Norwich City at Wembley. A knee injury forced his retirement in 1976 and prompted manager Ron Saunders to sign Andy Gray from Dundee United as his replacement.

Coaching career
Leonard took up coaching under Saunders at Aston Villa, and led the youth team to victory in the FA Youth Cup in 1980. When Saunders joined Birmingham City in 1982, he appointed Leonard as first-team coach.

After Saunders' resignation in 1986 Leonard acted as Birmingham's caretaker manager for one game before being dismissed when John Bond was appointed as Saunders' permanent successor. He went on to coach at West Bromwich Albion before leaving football to work at the Solihull Land Rover plant.

Career statistics

Honours

Player
Aston Villa
 Second Division second-place promotion: 1974–75
 League Cup: 1975

Youth team coach
Aston Villa
 FA Youth Cup: 1980

References

1950 births
Living people
Footballers from Birmingham, West Midlands
English footballers
Association football forwards
Kidderminster Harriers F.C. players
Darlaston Town F.C. players
Highgate United F.C. players
Aston Villa F.C. players
Port Vale F.C. players
English Football League players
Association football coaches
West Bromwich Albion F.C. non-playing staff
Aston Villa F.C. non-playing staff
Birmingham City F.C. non-playing staff
English football managers
Birmingham City F.C. managers
English Football League managers